= Eminectomy =

Eminectomy is a surgical procedure that reduces the articular eminence to correct chronic dislocation or locking of the mandible. The procedure is done under general anesthesia with nasal or oral intubation. Usually, pre-auricular incisions are performed to access the TMJ. The incision is made anterior to the ear depending on the case. The incision involves the skin and subcutaneous tissues and are carefully dissected, taking care to protect the temporal branch of the facial nerve. The zygomatic arch and articular eminence are then exposed. The articular eminence is reduced or removed using a surgical bur or osteotome. The remaining bone is smoothed to eliminate irregularities (to prevent any possible risk of relapse or discomfort) and provide an unobstructed pathway for movement of the condyle. The surgical site is subsequently irrigated, and the wound is closed.

The procedure is frequently performed by oral and maxillofacial surgeons, but may be performed by ENT surgeons.

When bilateral eminectomy is required, the procedure is repeated on the contralateral side. The third section of the dissection connects the incision's middle third to the dissection's superior and inferior thirds. Ice packs are applied to the surgical area for 24 hours following eminectomy. Appropriate patient selection is critical for a successful eminectomy procedure.
